Cynometra brachyrrhachis is a species of plant in the family Fabaceae. It is found only in Tanzania. It is threatened by habitat loss.

Taxonomy

References

brachyrrhachis
Flora of Tanzania
Vulnerable plants
Taxonomy articles created by Polbot